The 3rd Parliament of Great Britain was summoned by Queen Anne on 27 September 1710 and assembled on the 25 November 1710.  Under the Triennial Act, the Parliament was due to expire, if not dissolved sooner, at the end of the term of three years from the first meeting. In the event it was actually dissolved on 8 August 1713.

The new House of Commons comprised 346 Tories, 196 Whigs and 14 others, which represented a Tory landslide. This was largely due to anti-Government feelings caused by the trial of Henry Sacheverell for verbally attacking dissenters and a growing anti-war sentiment. William Bromley, Member of Parliament for Oxford University, was installed as Speaker of the House of Commons.

Initially Robert Harley as Chancellor of the Exchequer and head of the Queen's Ministry had problems in controlling the High Church Tories who were now dominant but a failed attempt by Antoine de Guiscard to assassinate him increased his popularity. However whilst he was recovering the Tories pushed through a bill to build 50 new churches in London (the New Churches in London and Westminster Act 1710). On his return Harley demonstrated his political and financial ability when he successfully obtained Parliamentary approval to establish the South Sea Company as a means of raising some £9 million to pay off Government debt. Shortly before the first session ended the Queen elevated Harley to the peerage as Earl of Oxford and promoted him to Lord Treasurer.

At the start of the second session the terms of a peace deal with France were defeated by the Whigs. Harley created 12 new Peers in the House of Lords, nicknamed "Harley's Dozen", to forestall a similar problem there. In the new year (1712) Parliament was busy on dealing with proceedings against the Duke of Marlborough, which led to his dismissal from his position as Captain-General, and against Robert Walpole on trumped up charges of embezzling public funds. Walpole was expelled from the Commons and committed briefly to the Tower of London. Harley then adroitly engineered condemnation of Britain's allies in the peace talks and by the end of the second session had got decisive backing for his policy of acting alone.

Completing the terms of the Treaty of Utrecht delayed the third session until April 1713. When it did reconvene there were open splits in the Tory party on a number of issues. Viscount Bolingbroke, a Secretary of State, took the opportunity to seek the leadership of the Party.

The Parliament was dissolved on 8 August 1713.

Notable Acts passed in the Parliament
 New Churches in London and Westminster Act 1710
 Gaming Act 1710
 Lease of Exeter Castle Act 1710
 Municipal Offices Act 1710
 Toleration Act 1711 (aka Occasional Conformity Act)
 Princess Sophia's Precedence Act 1711
 Scottish Episcopalians Act 1711
 Naturalization Act 1711
 Church Patronage (Scotland) Act 1711
 Churches in London and Westminster Act 1711
 East India Company Act 1711
 Pleading Act 1711
 West Riding Inclosures Act 1712
 Moss Troopers Act 1712
 Mortuaries (Bangor, &c.) Abolition Act 1713
 Established Church Act 1713 (aka Schism Act)
 Simony Act 1713
 Presentation of Benefices Act 1713
 Discovery of Longitude at Sea Act 1713
 Repair of Breach in Thames Bank at Dagenham: Coal Duties Act 1713

See also
1710 British general election
List of MPs elected in the British general election, 1710
List of Acts of the Parliament of Great Britain, 1707–19
Oxford-Bolingbroke ministry
List of parliaments of Great Britain

Sources

External links
 

Parliament of Great Britain
1710 establishments in Great Britain
1713 disestablishments in Great Britain